Noah Answerth (born 6 August 1999) is a professional Australian rules footballer playing for the Brisbane Lions in the Australian Football League (AFL). He was drafted by Brisbane with the 55th selection in the 2018 national draft. He made his debut in the win against  at Carrara Oval in round six of the 2019 season. Prior to being drafted he played for Oakleigh Chargers in the NAB League and his school Caulfield Grammar School

Statistics
Updated to the end of the 2022 season.

|-
| 2019 ||  || 43
| 19 || 2 || 0 || 156 || 68 || 224 || 70 || 55 || 0.1 || 0.0 || 8.2 || 3.6 || 11.8 || 3.7 || 2.9
|-
| 2020 ||  || 43
| 9 || 0 || 0 || 71 || 24 || 95 || 25 || 17 || 0.0 || 0.0 || 7.9 || 2.7 || 10.6 || 2.8 || 1.9
|-
| 2021 ||  || 43
| 0 || – || – || – || – || – || – || – || – || – || – || – || – || – || –
|-
| 2022 ||  || 43
| 23 || 0 || 0 || 221 || 102 || 323 || 111 || 60 || 0.0 || 0.0 || 9.6 || 4.4 || 14.0 || 4.8 || 2.6
|- class=sortbottom
! colspan=3 | Career
! 51 !! 2 !! 0 !! 448 !! 194 !! 642 !! 206 !! 132 !! 0.0 !! 0.0 !! 8.8 !! 3.8 !! 12.6 !! 4.0 !! 2.6
|}

Notes

Honours and achievements
Individual
 AFL Rising Star nominee: 2019 (round 20)

References

External links

1999 births
Living people
Brisbane Lions players
Australian rules footballers from Victoria (Australia)
People educated at Caulfield Grammar School